The Hokuriku Electric Power Company  supplies power by a regulated monopoly to Toyama Prefecture, Ishikawa Prefecture, the northern part of Fukui Prefecture, and northwestern parts of Gifu Prefecture.

Their headquarters are in Toyama, Toyama.  Recently, Kei Takahara was adopted as their image character.  They have also launched a campaign called .

Fuel mix 
In 2011 Rikuden's power generating mix in percentage of total output was as follows: 
 Coal: 62%
 Hydro: 26%
 Oil: 10%
 Nuclear: 1%
 Renewables: 1%

Power Stations 
In 2011 Rikuden had a total generating capacity of 8,058 MW (9,185 MW, including purchased or contracted capacity).

Thermal power stations 
Rikuden has 4,400 MW of generating capacity through its thermal generating stations through 6 fossil fuels powered stations.
 Fukui Thermal Power Station - 250 MW (Unit 1 stopped in 2004)
 Nanao Ota Thermal Power Station - 1,200 MW
 Toyama Thermal Power Station - 250 MW (Unit 2 stopped in 2001 and units 1 and 3 stopped in 2004)
 Toyama II - 1,500 MW
 Tsuruga Thermal Power Station - 1,200 MW

Hydroelectric 

Rikuden has 1,905 MW of hydroelectric capacity through 128 separate generating stations.
 Arimine I - 265 MW
 Arimine II - 120 MW
 Wada II - 122 MW
 Jindsugawa I - 82 MW
 Jindsugawa II - 40 MW
 more

Nuclear Power Plants 
Rikuden generates 1,746 MW of electricity from nuclear power.
 Shika Nuclear Power Plant
 Tōkai Nuclear Power Plant - part-owned through Japan Atomic Power Company
 Tsuruga Nuclear Power Plant - also part-owned through Japan Atomic Power Company

Renewables 
Rikuden generates 7 MW electricity from renewable sources at 5 sites.

See also 
 Nuclear power in Japan

References 

Nuclear power companies of Japan
Electric power companies of Japan
Companies based in Toyama Prefecture
Japanese companies established in 1951
Energy companies established in 1951